Gabriel E. Hart (born February 14, 1978) is a motion picture, music video director and commercial director.

Career 
After being denied entry into film school, he became a self-taught editor, screenwriter, producer and director. In 2006, he won an award for Best Music Video in the Urban Mediamakers Film Festival (UMFF) for Evander Holyfield's artist Cuttboy G Dinero's "Waiting For My Season" video. Fairly new to the entertainment industry, he has been featured in XXL Magazine and Ozone Magazine for his quick rise to the music video forefront for his creativity and strong use of narrative seen in his work. He has also directed music videos for Ice Cube, Rocko, Future, B.o.B, Mr. Bangladesh, Ne-Yo and Young Jeezy. In 2011, Gabriel Hart made The Hip Hop 100 - The One Hundred Most Influential People Hiphopblog.com Nominated 2011 BEFFTA Awards, "Atlanta’s household names such as Tyler Perry, Idris Elba, Dwight Eubanks and Gabriel Hart are all BEFFTA Nominees". In 2011 Gabriel Hart went on to receive the 2011 BEFFTA USA Awards, for Best Video Director. He received national press ABC NEWS for the"My President" video he directed for Young Jeezy ft. Nas.

Videography

Music videos
Migos
Versace (2013)
Hannah Montana (2013)
Handsome and Wealthy (2014)
Nick Cannon "Dance Floor" (2013)
Gucci Mane ft. Wiz Khalifa "Nothing On Ya" (2013)
Gucci Mane ft. Future "F' Da World" (2012)
Bangladesh ft. Pusha T & Jadakiss
100 (2012)
Phantom ft. Baby (YMCMB) & 2 Chainz (2012)
Cash Out
Cashin' Out (2012)
T'Melle ft. Waka Flocka Flame
Go to War (2012)
Karmella ft. Cyhi The Prynce
Karma (2012)
Gucci Mane
Jugg (2012)
Gucci Two Times Dude (2011)
Birds of a Feather ft. Rocko (2011)
Future
Ain't No Way Around It w/ DJ Drama (2012)
Travis Porter
Make It Rain (2011) (MTV Jam of the Week)

Ice Cube
I Rep That West Lynch Mob Records
B.o.B
Guest List ft. Roscoe Dash (2012)
How Bout Dat ft. Future & Trae the Truth (2012) T.I. appears in video but does not perform
I'll Be in the Sky (2008) (MTV Jam of the Week)
Bet I ft. T.I. & Playboy Tre (2010)
Charlie Boy Gang
Beef It Up (2012) (MTV Jam of the Week)
Young A ft. Tay Don & Gucci Mane
What They Say (2012)
Starlito
I Shake Life ft. Yo Gotti (2011)
Candice Pillay
I Wear My Shades (Remix) ft. Bangladesh (2011)
Yo Gotti
Harder ft. Rick Ross (2012)
Racked Up (2012)
We Can Get It On (2011) (MTV Jam of the Week)
Make it Work (2010)
Once Upon a Time (2010)
Thin Line (2010)
Millionaire (2010)
Pryce
Clean Down (2011)
Drumma Boy
Real Up ft. Nicole Wray (2011)
Scar
Til' I Get There ft. Tre (2012)
Young Dolph
I Think I'm Sprung ft. Juicy J (2011)
Dats Gangsta ft. DJ Squeeky (2011)
Rokin ft. Tim Gates (2011)
I Need My Medicine (2011)
Fat Joe ft. Rico Love
No Problems (2010)
8Ball & MJG
Ten Toes Down (2010)
DJ Bring It Back ft. Young Dro (2010)
Plies
Letter to the Industry (2010)
Baby Boy ft. Yung LA
Stuntin (2010)
The Lox 
Get This Paper (2009)
Ethan Hanson
Georgia (2012)
Cuttboy G Dinero
 Waiting For My Season (2006)
Lil' Mo
Sumtimes I ft. Jim Jones (2007)
Curtains
Black Folks (2008)
Rocko
Thumb Through the Check (2012)
I Can't Wait (2012)
Going Steady (Remix) ft. Plies (2011) (MTV Jam of the Week)
I Salute ft. Gucci Mane (2011)
Star ft. Geno (2011)
Exit Strategy(2011)
Dis Morning (2008)
Ima Have It All (2009)
Mr. Bangladesh
 A Milli Remix ft. Ne-Yo (2008)
 Adidas (2008)
Young Jeezy
 Who Dat (2008) (MTV Jam of the Week)
 My President ft. Nas (2009) (MTV Jam of the Week)
 Welcome Back (2009)
 Don't Do It (2009)
 Get A lot ft. Boo (2009)
 Trap or Die 2 (2010)
 Go Hard (2010)
 Camero (2010)
 Just Saying (2010)
Fat Joe
 CupCakes ft. Benisour (2009)
Young Dro
 Take Off ft. Yung LA (2009)
 "I Don't Know Y'all" ft. Yung LA (2009) (MTV Jam of the Week)
Fat Joe ft. Jimi Hendrix
"Hey Joe" (2009)
Boo Rossini
"I Stop" (2009)
"Comeback" (2009)
"I'm Loaded"
Beans ft. Rocko
"I Got Swagg" (2009)
B.G. ft. Mannie Fresh
"My Hood" (2009)
"Back to the Money" (2009)
CTE PRESENTS U.S.D.A/ Young Jeezy J.W. Boo Rossini Bigga Rankin
"Money Aint A Problem" (2009)

Television series
Full Circle
(Network television episode) Southern Icon Films

References 

Ice Cube Trades His Cap For A Sombrero In 'I Rep That West' Video To avoid L.A. video clichés, director Gabriel Hart takes it to the Wild West

1978 births
Living people
American music video directors
Place of birth missing (living people)